The cello suites by Benjamin Britten (Opp. 72, 80, and 87) are a series of three compositions for solo cello, dedicated to Mstislav Rostropovich.  The suites were the first original solo instrumental music that Britten wrote for and dedicated to Rostropovich, but Britten had earlier composed a cadenza for Joseph Haydn's Cello Concerto in C major, for Rostropovich, in 1964.  Rostropovich gave the first performances of each work, and recorded Suites Nos 1 and 2 commercially.

Cello Suite No. 1, Op. 72
Britten wrote the First Suite at the end of 1964.  The premiere was at the Aldeburgh Festival on 27 June 1965. The suite is in nine movements, played without pause:
 Canto primo: Sostenuto e largamente
 Fuga: Andante moderato
 Lamento: Lento rubato
 Canto secondo: Sostenuto
 Serenata: Allegretto pizzicato
 Marcia: Alla marcia moderato
 Canto terzo: Sostenuto
 Bordone: Moderato quasi recitativo
 Moto perpetuo e Canto quarto: Presto
The score was published in 1966.

Cello Suite No. 2, Op. 80
The Second Suite dates from the summer of 1967.  Rostropovich gave the premiere at the Aldeburgh Festival, Snape Maltings, on 17 June 1968.  The score was published in 1969.  The movements are as follows:
 Declamato: Largo
 Fuga: Andante
 Scherzo: Allegro molto
 Andante lento
 Ciaccona: Allegro

Cello Suite No. 3, Op. 87
Britten composed the Third Suite in 1971, inspired by Rostropovich's playing of the unaccompanied Cello Suites of Bach.  Rostropovich first performed the suite at the Snape Maltings, 21 December 1974. In 1979 the Britten Estate authorised Julian Lloyd Webber to make the suite's first recording.

The Third Suite is in nine movements, performed without pause:
 Introduzione: Lento
 Marcia: Allegro
 Canto: Con Moto
 Barcarolla: Lento
 Dialogo: Allegretto
 Fuga: Andante espressivo
 Recitativo: Fantastico
 Moto perpetuo: Presto
 Passacaglia: Lento solenne
The work incorporates four Russian themes, including three arrangements of folksongs by Pyotr Tchaikovsky, reminiscent of Beethoven's use of Russian themes in the Razumovsky quartets. The final Russian tune, stated simply at the end of the set, is the Kontakion of the Departed, the Russian Orthodox Hymn for the Dead. Philip Brett considers the Third Suite to be the most passionate of the three.

References

Sources
 Philip Brett: "Benjamin Britten", Grove Music Online, ed. L. Macy.
 Aquino, F. Avellar de. "Song of Sorrow". in The Strad Magazine, London, v. 117, Vol. 1391, p. 52-57, 2006. (on Britten's Third Cello Suite)

Cello Suites
Solo cello pieces
Suites (music)
1964 compositions
1967 compositions
1971 compositions